Castell de l'Areny is a small town and municipality in the comarca of Berguedà, Catalonia. The old town of Sant Romà de la Clusa is within the municipal limits.

History

Places of interest
 Church of Sant Vicenç, Romanesque
 Church of Sant Romà de la Clusa, Romanesque

References

External links
 Government data pages 

Municipalities in Berguedà
Populated places in Berguedà